Andreas Alariesto, (December 11, 1900 – November 29, 1989) was a Finnish painter from Sompio, Lapland, who worked in the naïve style. He also made miniatures and sculptures about miniatures, and was also a photographer. He had no formal artistic training.

Alariesto was born in Riesto. He became famous in the 1970s with an increase in the popularity of naïve art. His first formal show was in Helsinki and Rovaniemi in 1976 when the artist was 75 years old. He died in Sodankylä, aged 88.

References

References
 Teuvo Termonen: Suomalaista postikorttitaidetta, part 4, pages 14–15, Suomen Postikorttiyhdistys Apollo 2006, 

1900 births
1989 deaths
People from Sodankylä
People from Oulu Province (Grand Duchy of Finland)
20th-century Finnish painters
20th-century Finnish male artists
Naïve painters
Finnish male painters
Self-taught artists